Wadlew  is a village in the administrative district of Gmina Drużbice, within Bełchatów County, Łódź Voivodeship, in central Poland.

The village has a population of 470.

References

Wadlew
Piotrków Governorate
Łódź Voivodeship (1919–1939)